The 1929–30 Montreal Canadiens season was the team's 21st season. The team placed second in the Canadian Division and qualified for the playoffs. The team won three series to win the Stanley Cup, for the third time in team history, and the second time in the National Hockey League (NHL).

Regular season
To combat low scoring, a major rule change was implemented. Players were now allowed forward passing in the offensive zone, instead of only in the defensive and neutral zones. This led to abuse: players sat in front of the opposing net waiting for a pass. The rule was changed again mid-season in December 1929, and players were no longer allowed to enter the offensive zone before the puck. Hence the birth of the modern-day offside rule. The Canadiens doubled their scoring output compared to the previous season.

Highlights
On December 14, 1929, Alfred Lepine scored four goals and added one assist in the second period of a game versus Ottawa, won 6–4 by Montreal. As of 2009, this feat is still the Canadiens' record for goals and points in one period.

Final standings

Record vs. opponents

Schedule and results

Playoffs
The Canadiens, by placing second had to play in the first round series versus the Chicago Black Hawks. The Canadiens won the two-game total-goals series 3–2. Next, were the New York Rangers who had defeated the Ottawa Senators in their first round series. The Canadiens swept the Rangers two games to none in a best-of-three series. The teams played 68 minutes and 52 seconds of overtime in the first game before Gus Rivers scored to win the game for the Canadiens.

Finals

The Canadiens advanced to the final against the Boston Bruins. The Bruins were heavily favoured, after winning all meetings with the Canadiens during the regular season. However, it meant little as the Canadiens swept the Bruins in two straight (3–0, 4–3) to win the Stanley Cup.

Player statistics

Regular season
Scoring

Goaltending

† Worters was loaned from the New York Americans for one game on February 27, 1930, vs. Toronto.

Playoffs
Scoring

Goaltending

Transactions

See also
1929–30 NHL season

References

 

Montreal Canadiens seasons
Montreal
Montreal